Romance Bloody Romance: Remixes & B-Sides is a 2005 remix album by Death from Above (then known as Death from Above 1979). This album is a collection of remixes of songs featured on the album You're a Woman, I'm a Machine released in October 2004. The tracks "Better Off Dead" and "You're Lovely (But You've Got Problems)" are B-sides. The group MSTRKRFT was, at the time, a side project of Jesse F. Keeler, who was one half of Death from Above 1979. The Girl on Girl name is the alias of the other half of Death from Above 1979, Sebastien Grainger. The album is their only release to chart on Billboard by hitting number twenty-two on its Top Electronic Albums chart.

Track listing

Note: "You're Lovely (But You've Got Problems)" was also released under the name "Girl U R Lovely" on their Live Session (iTunes Exclusive) EP

Personnel
Death From Above 1979
Jesse F. Keeler – bass guitar, synthesizer, songwriting on all tracks except 1, production on track 1
Sebastien Grainger – drums, vocals, songwriting on all tracks except 1, production on tracks 1 and 12

Additional personnel

Owen Pallett – backing vocals and string arrangement on track 12
Al-P – production on all tracks except track 8
Paul Epworth – production on track 8
Leon Taheny – production on track 12
Noah Mintz – mastering
Mark Andreasson – songwriting on track 1
Peter Dayton – songwriting on track 1

References

Death from Above 1979 albums
2005 remix albums
Vice Records albums